Dawn Alison Louise Bowden (born 14 February 1960) is a British Labour Party politician and trade unionist serving as Chief Whip of the Welsh Government and Deputy Minister for Arts and Sport since 2021. Bowden has been the Member of the Senedd (MS) for Merthyr Tydfil and Rhymney since 2016.

Early life and education
Bowden was born on 14 February 1960 in Bristol, England. She was educated at St Bernadette Catholic Secondary School, a state-funded Catholic school in Bristol. Then, from 1976 to 1978, she undertook a secretarial course at Soundwell Technical College.

Career

Early career
Bowden began her working life as a secretary. She worked for the National Health Service between 1979 and 1982, and for Bristol City Council from 1982 to 1983.

From April 2012 until her election to the Welsh Assembly in May 2016, Bowden was the head of health for UNISON Cymru/Wales (the Welsh division of the national trade union UNISON).

Political career
In February 2016, it was announced that Bowden had been selected from an all-women shortlist to be the Welsh Labour candidate for the Merthyr Tydfil and Rhymney constituency seat in the next Welsh Assembly election. The all-women shortlist was controversial; it drew criticism from a number of male councillors, including the leader of Merthyr Tydfil County Borough Council. On 5 May 2016, she was elected a Member of the Welsh Assembly with 9,763 votes (47.2% of votes cast).

Personal life
Bowden has two children. Sam and Jack. In 2011, she married Martin; he works as a policy officer for Welsh Labour.

References

1960 births
Living people
Welsh Labour members of the Senedd
Female members of the Senedd
Wales MSs 2016–2021
Wales MSs 2021–2026
Women trade unionists
Trade unionists from Bristol